Leopold Hofmann (also Ludwig Hoffman, Leopold Hoffman, Leopold Hoffmann; 14 August 1738 – 17 March 1793) was an Austrian composer of classical music.

Biography
Hofmann was the son of a highly educated civil servant, and at the age of seven became a chorister in the chapel of the Empress Elisabeth Christine, where his choral director and teacher was very likely František Tůma.

He was also a student later on of Georg Christoph Wagenseil and Giuseppe Trani (violin). His studies included at various points violin, harpsichord and composition.

In 1758 Hofmann secured what may have been his first appointment, as "musicus" at St. Michael's. He is known to have become choral director at St. Peter's Church in 1764 and, in 1766, kapellmeister. In 1769 he became a teacher to the royal family.

The position of Kapellmeister at the Cathedral of St. Stephan, a post he acquired in 1772, was among his next responsibilities. At this time he declined the directorship of the Imperial Chapel, but did apply there two years later in 1774, failing in his application.  (Giuseppe Bonno became director of the Imperial Chapel instead, which had become open upon the death of Florian Leopold Gassmann.)

On 9 May 1791, at his own request, Mozart was appointed assistant-Kapellmeister to Hofmann, an unpaid position. At the time Hofmann was ill and Mozart anticipated becoming Kapellmeister upon Hofmann's death. However, Hofmann survived Mozart and kept his post as Cathedral Kapellmeister until he died.

Selected worklist

Symphonies
The following list was drawn up by George Cook Kimball in his Ph.D. thesis.

Concertos
The following list was drawn up by Allan Badley in his Ph.D. thesis.

Other works
A mass a cappella (republished with masses by Wagenseil and Georg Reutter by A-R Editions in 2004)
Duos and sonatas for various instruments, including a divertimento for flute and bassoon, one for 2 violins with continuo, one for two violas with bass. His opus 1 is a set of sonatas a tre for viola and violoncello with cello accompaniment.
Choral music
Motet "Altra nocte"
"Pastor bone : chorus pastoralis" for mixed choir, concertante organ, two violins and bass (2 oboes, 2 trumpets and drums probably added later).
 Missa "Sancti Aloysii" in D major
 Requiem in C minor

(Recent recordings of his music include recordings of many of the concertos, some of the symphonies including five on Naxos Records, etc., including a CD from 2000 of Artaria discoveries and others of cello flute, violin and oboe concertos.)

His compositions have been catalogued by Allan Badley.

References

Further reading
Eisen, Cliff. Kimball, George Cook. and Monk, Dennis C. Three symphonies / Franz Asplmayr ; edited by Dennis C. Monk. Four symphonies, them. index D7, E♭1, D1, D2 / Leopold Hofmann ; edited by G. Cook Kimball. Three symphonies, them. index 23, 18, 25 / Wenzel Pichl ; introduction by Richard J. Agee ; thematic index compiled by Anita Zakin. Salzburg. Part 1. The Symphony in Salzburg: Volume 1. New York: Garland, 1984. .
Kreiner, Viktor. Leopold Hofmann als Sinfoniker (1738–1793). Thesis (doctoral) Universität Wien, 1958.
Umble, Kathryn Thomas. A transcription and stylistic analysis of Leopold Hoffmann's Flute Concerto in G Thesis (Master of Music [Thesis # 4539]) Bowling Green State University, May 1985.
Badley, Allan: Leopold Hofmann (1738-1793). Sechs Konzerte für Tasteninstrument (Denkmäler der Tonkunst in Österreich, Band 161). Wien, Hollitzer, 2019  (in german and english language).

External links
 
 HOASM bio
 Bio and list of works at the Michael Haydn Site
 Biography and Naxos discography
 Editions by Leopold Hofmann at Artaria Editions

1738 births
1793 deaths
Austrian Classical-period composers
Composers for cello
18th-century classical composers
18th-century Austrian male musicians
Austrian male classical composers